Keynsham Town L.F.C. are an English women's football club affiliated with Keynsham Town F.C. and currently playing in the .

History
The club was formed under the name Super Strikers Girls in 1993, as an U-11 six-a-side team, by pupils of Chandag Junior School. Over the next four years they were renamed Protel Super Strikers and adopted a green and white kit modelled on that of Celtic F.C.

In 1998 the club linked up with Keynsham Town F.C., became Keynsham Town Ladies, and entered a senior team in the South West Women's Football League Division Two.

The team progressed through the league, winning promotion to Division One (South) in 1998–99, to the Premier Division in 2001–02, to the South West Combination Women's league in 2003–04 having won the Premier Division title, and eventually to the FA Women's Premier League Southern Division in 2005–06, having won the South West Combination Women's league.

Due to the club's proximity to universities in Bath and Bristol, Keynsham Town Ladies were able to attract a number of international players to an increasingly cosmopolitan squad. When the club reached the quarter-finals of the Premier League Cup for the first time in 2009–10, the squad named for the 4–0 defeat to Arsenal contained nine different nationalities.

After the club's most successful league finish of third in 2009–10, manager Barrie Newton signed a number of prominent players, including Corinne Yorston (on loan from Bristol Academy), Suzanne Grant and Jade Radburn.

Current squad

Updated 7 February 2022

Former players

Coaching Staff

External links
Official Website

References

Women's football clubs in England
Keynsham
1993 establishments in England
Football clubs in Somerset
FA Women's National League teams